Highland Cemetery in Ypsilanti, Michigan is a  cemetery founded in 1864. It was designed by Col. James Lewis Glenn in 1863. The cemetery was listed on the National Register of Historic Places in 2020.

History
Ypsilanti had earlier cemeteries, established in the first half of the 19th century. However, by 1850 the city was expanding eastward, and in 1858 Mayor Chauncey Joslin proposed that the city purchase the plot that subsequently became Highland Cemetery. However, this move failed, likely over objections to using tax money to purchase the land. However, in 1863, a group of citizens formed the Highland Cemetery Association for the purpose of establishing a cemetery. They hired James L. Glen to draw up a plan, and in 1864 purchased the land and dedicated Highland Cemetery. By 1880, nearly 550 burial plots had been spoken for. In 1880, the ornamental gate was constructed in the front of the cemetery, and in 1888 a Richardsonian Romanesque chapel was built in the center of the cemetery.

In 1901, additional property to the south was added to the cemetery. A short time later the entrance lodge was moved, and fieldstone piers added. A mausoleum was built in 1925. Further portions of the cemetery were platted as needed, and Highland Cemetery remains the primary burial place for the city of Ypsilanti. It is still operated by the Highland Cemetery Association.

Description
Highland Cemetery covers about 50 acres, with a rolling, sloped topography which includes knolls, valleys, and ravines. A number of structures dating from 1880-1925 are included on the grounds. As designed by Glen, the cemetery features curved paths through stands of trees.

The cemetery is the site of the Starkweather Memorial Chapel which was commissioned by Mary Ann Starkweather to honor her husband. The chapel, an example of Richardsonian Romanesque style, was designed by George D. Mason and completed in 1889.
There is also a Civil War memorial on the cemetery grounds, which an inscription says was also presented by Mary Ann Starkweather.
The entrance to the cemetery is located at 943 N. River St. The cemetery is located in a wooded area of oak, pine, cedar and willow trees.

The Highland Cemetery Association, a non-profit cemetery company founded in 1863, owns and operates the cemetery.

In 2009, the cemetery began sponsoring an ice cream social after the annual Ypsilanti Memorial Day parade which terminates at the cemetery.

Notable persons interred at Highland
 Edward P. Allen, US Congressman and Civil War veteran
 Owen Cleary, Michigan Secretary of State and president of Cleary College
 P. Roger Cleary, founder of Cleary College
 Byron M. Cutcheon, Civil War brevet brigadier general and Medal of Honor recipient and Congressman from Michigan to the U.S. House of Representatives
 Justus McKinstry, disgraced Civil War major (brigadier general appointment expired without confirmation), suspended November 13, 1861, dismissed from service for corruption, January 28, 1863
 Edwin F. Uhl, Mayor of Grand Rapids, Michigan, Ambassador to Germany and United States Assistant Secretary of State.

Gallery

References

External links

 Highland Cemetery Official Site
 

1864 establishments in Michigan
Buildings and structures completed in 1864
Cemeteries in Michigan
Ypsilanti, Michigan
National Register of Historic Places in Washtenaw County, Michigan